Thomas Bolitho may refer to:
 
 Thomas Bedford Bolitho (1835–1915), Cornish banker, industrialist and politician
 Thomas Robins Bolitho (1840–1925), English banker and landowner